Alexandra is a suburb of Mackay in the Mackay Region, Queensland, Australia.

Geography 
Alexandra is flat low-lying land bordered to the north by the Pioneer River and to the south by Bakers Creek. The Peak Downs Highway passes from east to west through the centre of the locality; there is a junction with the Mackay–Eungella Road which exits the locality in the north-west. Most of the housing is clustered around these two roads. Most of the land in the suburb is used for sugarcane farming.

The Finch Hatton branch of the Mackay Railway ran through the locality from east to west. After the closure of the railway, a sugarcane tramways replaced it to provide transport for the harvested sugarcane from the canefields to the sugar mills.

The Rocks is a neighbourhood in the locality.

History 
The suburb's name is taken from the Alexandra sugar mill. The mill, in turn, was named by mill owner Thomas Henry Fitzgerald after Princess Alexandra of Denmark who married Prince Edward (later King Edward VII) of Great Britain on 10 March 1863.

The mill was constructed in 1868 and was the largest sugar mill in Queensland. It operated until 1884.

Education 
There are no schools in Alexandra. The nearest primary school is Walkerston State School in neighbouring Walkerston to the west. The nearest secondary school is Mackay State High School in Mackay to the east.

See also 
 List of sugar mills in Queensland

References

External links

Suburbs of Mackay, Queensland